John Thompson Dorrance (November 11, 1873 – September 21, 1930) was an American chemist who discovered a method to create condensed soup, and served as president of the Campbell Soup Company from 1914 to 1930.

Early life
Born in Bristol, Pennsylvania, he earned a Bachelor of Science degree from the Massachusetts Institute of Technology, where he was a member of Sigma Alpha Epsilon fraternity, and a doctor of philosophy from the University of Göttingen in Germany. He turned down offers to join the faculty at Cornell University and Columbia University to pursue work with his uncle.

Career
A nephew of the general manager of the Joseph Campbell Preserve Company, he went to work there in 1897 and invented condensed soup.

Dorrance went on to become the president of Campbell Soup Company from 1914 to 1930, eventually buying out the Campbell family. He turned the business into one of America's longest-lasting brands. He was succeeded by his brother, Arthur Dorrance.

Personal life
In 1906 he married Ethel Mallinckrodt, with whom he had five children.

Death
Dorrance died on September 21, 1930 of heart disease at his home in Cinnaminson Township, New Jersey. He was buried in West Laurel Hill Cemetery in Bala Cynwyd, Pennsylvania. His estate in Radnor Township, Pennsylvania is now the home of Cabrini University.

Following Dorrance's death, there was significant litigation over his domicile for purposes of estate and inheritance tax.  The Supreme Court of Pennsylvania held that he was domiciled in Pennsylvania, and the Supreme Court of New Jersey held that he was domiciled in New Jersey, and his estate was required to pay estate tax to both states.  The estate sought relief in the United States Supreme Court, but the request for review was denied.

Legacy
In 2012, Dorrance was elected into the New Jersey Hall of Fame.

See also
Dorrance Mansion

References

External links
West Laurel Hill Cemetery web site

1873 births
1930 deaths
American food chemists
American food industry business executives
Campbell Soup Company people
Massachusetts Institute of Technology alumni
People from Bristol, Pennsylvania
People from Cinnaminson Township, New Jersey
University of Göttingen alumni
Businesspeople from Pennsylvania
Dorrance family